Zed Books is an independent non-fiction publishing company based in London, UK. It was founded in 1977 under the name Zed Press by Roger van Zwanenberg.

Zed publishes books for an international audience of both general and academic readers, covering areas such as politics and global current affairs, economics, gender studies and sexualities, development studies and the environment.

Ownership
Until 2020, Zed Books was organzed as a worker-owned cooperative. 

Authors 
Zed's authors include Nawal El Saadawi, Eleanor Roosevelt, Assata Shakur, Yanis Varoufakis, Vandana Shiva, Maggie Nelson, Ece Temelkuran and Paul French, as well as hundreds of internationally respected journalists and academics.

References

External links
 Zed Books Official Website
 Zed Books on Library Thing

Book publishing companies based in London
Publishing companies established in 1977
Environmental publishers